Söğütlüçeşme railway station is a railway station in the Kadıköy district of İstanbul, Turkey. Up until 2013, the station was serviced by commuter trains as well as regional and intercity trains. Söğütlüçeşme was closed down on 19 June 2013 for the rehabilitation and expansion of the railway for the new Marmaray commuter rail system.

Söğütlüçeşme station reopened on March 12, 2019 along with the rest of the Marmaray project until Gebze

History

The original station was opened in 1872 by the Ottoman government, as part of a railway from Kadıköy to İzmit. This station was located just north of the actual one at ground level. The station, along with the railway, was sold to the Ottoman Anatolian Railway (CFOA) in 1880. The CFOA operated the railway until 1924, when it was bought by the Turkish government and eventually taken over by the Turkish State Railways. Söğütlüçeşme station became a stop on the Haydarpaşa suburban in 1951 and was electrified in 1969.

The current station was built between 1975 and 1979 and opened in 1985. In 2009 the Istanbul Metrobus was extended from Zincirlikuyu to  Söğütlüçeşme, making Söğütlüçeşme became the first station on the Haydarpaşa suburban to be connected to the rest of Istanbul's public transport network.

Vicinity

Söğütlüçeşme station is located above Söğütlüçeşme park. To the north side of the station, connections to Metrobus service to Üsküdar, Levent and western İstanbul is available. Another important building in the vicinity is the Kadıkoy Municipality Headquarters, located directly north of the station. Alongside to the east of the station, the wedding hall building of the district Kadıköy is situated.

The neighborhoods surrounding Söğütlüçeşme station are Acıbadem to the northwest, Hasanpaşa directly north, Fikirtepe and Eğitim to the northeast, Zühtüpaşa to the southeast, Osmanağa and Caferağa (Kadıköy city center) directly south and Rasimpaşa to the southwest.

Layout

Layout

Public transport connections
Following public transportation lines serve the railway station:
Bus system

Metrobus
 34A Söğütlüçeşme-Edirnekapı
 34G Söğütlüçeşme-(Tüyap)Beylikdüzü (Only Night)(G = Gece = Night)
 34Z Söğütlüçeşme-Zincirlikuyu

Gallery

References

External links
 Söğütlüçeşme station info
 Adapazarı regional train timetables
 Eastbound Haydarpaşa commuter service
 Westbound Haydarpaşa commuter service

Transport in Kadıköy

Railway stations in Istanbul Province
Railway stations opened in 1872
1872 establishments in the Ottoman Empire
2013 disestablishments in Turkey
High-speed railway stations in Turkey